The 1981–82 Algerian Championnat National was the 20th season of the Algerian Championnat National since its establishment in 1962. A total of 16 teams contested the league, with RS Kouba as the defending champions, The Championnat started on September 4, 1981. and ended on May 14, 1982.

Team summaries

Promotion and relegation 
Teams promoted from Algerian Division 2 1981–1982 
 ESM Guelma
 WO Boufarik

Teams relegated to Algerian Division 2 1982–1983
 DNC Alger
 Chlef SO

League table

References

External links
1981–82 Algerian Championnat National

Algerian Championnat National
Championnat National
Algerian Ligue Professionnelle 1 seasons